Banari is a comune (municipality) in the Province of Sassari in the Italian region Sardinia, located about  north of Cagliari and about  southeast of Sassari.

Banari borders the following municipalities: Bessude, Florinas, Ittiri, Siligo.

References

External links

 Official website

Cities and towns in Sardinia